Jefferson Public Radio (JPR) is a regional public radio broadcasting network serving over a million potential listeners in Southern Oregon and the Shasta Cascade region of northern California. Owned by Southern Oregon University, the network is headquartered on the SOU campus in Ashland, near Medford.

JPR's flagship station, KSOR in Ashland, signed on in April 1969 as a 10-watt station operated by students at what was then Southern Oregon College. It began moving away from its college radio roots during the 1970s, becoming a full NPR member by the end of the decade.  In the early 1980s, it began building a massive system of translators covering large portions of Oregon and California, and now claims one of the largest translator network of any public radio station in the country.

At first, KSOR was not familiar with the history of Jefferson.  However, by the time KSOR began to build full-power satellites later in the decade, it realized that its service area was virtually coextensive with the State of Jefferson.  It rebranded itself as "Jefferson Public Radio" in 1989, feeling that name was more than appropriate for its growing network and the area it served.

Programming
The network broadcasts local programming as well as programs from National Public Radio, Public Radio Exchange, American Public Media, and the BBC World Service among other sources.

Its programming is organized into three broadcasting services. Most listeners in the JPR service area can choose between all three services, giving them a programming choice comparable to those in far larger markets.

Classics & News
"Classics & News" was KSOR/JPR's original radio service and can be heard throughout the JPR broadcast area. The service has the most translators and the most powerful signals. On weekdays the service plays NPR's news programs Morning Edition, and All Things Considered, and local classical music programming during the midday. In the evenings, the service runs WFMT's Beethoven Network hosted by Peter van de Graff, branded as  State Farm Music Hall. For many years, it signed off from 2-5 a.m., but now airs 24 hours a day.

Ten FM stations and 28 translators make up JPR's "Classics & News Service". Outside the JPR area, C & N broadcasts in Mendocino on a translator.

Rhythm & News
"Rhythm & News" is JPR's second oldest service, designed to complement C&N while running Morning Edition and All Things Considered for a longer period. During the middle of the day, local hosts program a show called "Open Air" that features a unique blend of indie rock/pop, AAA, and Americana music. The evening features adult album alternative programming from World Cafe and "UnderCurrents". Like "Classics & News",  "Rhythm & News" also signed off the air from 2-5 a.m. for many years before adopting a 24-hour schedule.

There are five FM stations and six translators broadcasting the "Rhythm & News" service.

News & Information
"News & Information" is JPR's extended news service offering JPR's only local talk show, The Jefferson Exchange, as well as the NPR talk shows 1A, Here & Now and Fresh Air. It airs the BBC World Service overnights.

Eight AM stations and three FM stations carry the "News & Information Service".

Expansion

In 2004, as a response to a perceived lack of public radio programming in other cities, Jefferson Public Radio began expanding its service outside of the traditional State of Jefferson. Stations in Eugene and Mendocino were purchased for the news and information format, and the news and information station in Eureka was purchased by JPR from an owner who had programmed it with the BBC World Service 24 hours a day. The purchase of the station in Eureka was particularly controversial as it was thought that it would compete directly with Humboldt State University's KHSU.

See also 
 List of radio stations in Oregon
 List of radio stations in California
 Oregon Public Broadcasting
 Southern Oregon Public Television
 Jefferson (Pacific state)

References

External links 
 
 April 2003 article about JPR from the American Journalism Review

American radio networks
NPR member networks

Southern Oregon University
Mass media in Humboldt County, California
1969 establishments in Oregon